Anne-Marie Gaillard (12 July 1843 – 22 July 1884, in a clinic at Vanves), known as Nina de Villard de Callias, Nina de Callias or Nina de Villard, was a French composer, pianist, writer, and salon hostess.

The daughter of a rich Lyon lawyer, after her marriage to Hector de Callias (comte de Callias, a writer and journalist on Le Figaro) she hosted one of the most prominent literary and artistic salons of Paris. She was married to de Callias from 1864 to 1868, and had a decade-long love affair (1867-1877) with Charles Cros, whom she inspired to paint Coffret de santal. She is also the Dame aux éventails by Édouard Manet.

Guests who attended her salons included Hector Berlioz, Edgar Degas, Anatole France, Augusta Holmes, Stéphane Mallarme, Manet, Arthur Rimbaud, and Richard Wagner, among others. By 1869 she was hosting young poets in search of new forms of expression, known collectively as the Parnassians.

She composed works for piano and voice, and contributed two poems to Le Parnasse contemporain (2nd volume): La Jalousie du jeune Dieu and Tristan & Iseult. The Franco-Prussian War forced her to flee with her mother to Geneva, where she adopted her mother's maiden name (Villard), and stayed three years before returning in 1873 to re-assume the dissolved artistic circles there. Back in France, she contributed to the  collective anthology Dixains Réalistes and to the circle known as The Hydropaths, a group considered to be a vital link in the development of Symbolism.

Her works include:

Piano 

Fantaisie sur Rigoletto
Nocturne
Romance
Souvenir de Vichy
Valse Brillante

Prose 
Feuillets parisiens, 1885 (Gallica)
La Duchesse Diane, 1882
La Jalousie du jeune Dieu
Tristan & Iseult

Voice 

"Paroles d'une Rose à un Rayon de Soleil"

External links
http://fr.wikisource.org/wiki/Nina_de_Callias
Biography
The Lady with Fans - Nina de Callias, Manet's model

References 

1843 births
1884 deaths
French women poets
19th-century French women writers
19th-century women writers
19th-century French poets
French salon-holders
French women classical composers